Nicholas Ware (1776–1824) was a U.S. Senator from Georgia from 1821 to 1824. Senator Ware may also refer to:

James Britton Ware (1830–1918), Georgia State Senate
James Franklin Ware (1849–1934), Wisconsin State Senate
John H. Ware III (1908–1997), Pennsylvania State Senate